The Thompson submachine gun (also known as the "Tommy Gun", "Chicago Typewriter", "Chicago Piano", "Trench Sweeper", or "Trench Broom") is a blowback-operated, selective-fire submachine gun, invented by United States Army brigadier general John T. Thompson in 1918. It was originally designed to break the stalemate of trench warfare of World War I, but was not finished until after the war ended.

The Thompson saw early use by the United States Marine Corps during the Banana Wars, the United States Postal Inspection Service, the Irish Republican Army, the Republic of China, and the FBI following the Kansas City Massacre.

The weapon was also sold to the general public. Because it could be obtained so easily, the Thompson became notorious during the Prohibition era as the signature weapon of various organized crime syndicates in the United States in the 1920s. It was a common sight in the media at the time, and was used by both law enforcement officers and criminals.

The Thompson was widely adopted by the U.S. armed forces during World War II, and was also used extensively by other Allied troops during the war. Its main models were designated as the M1928A1, M1 and M1A1 during this time. More than 1.5 million Thompson submachine guns were produced during World War II.

It is the first weapon to be labelled and marketed as a "submachine gun".

The original selective-fire Thompson variants are no longer produced, although numerous semi-automatic civilian versions are still being produced by the manufacturer Auto-Ordnance. These models retain a similar appearance to the original models, but have various modifications in order to comply with US firearm laws.

History and service

Development
Brigadier general John T. Thompson was the original developer of the Thompson submachine gun, who spent most of his career in the ordnance department of the U.S. Army. He envisioned it as being a fully automatic rifle in order to replace the bolt-action service rifles then in use (such as the American M1903 Springfield).

Thompson came across a patent issued to the American inventor John Bell Blish in 1915, while searching for a way to allow his weapon to operate safely without the complexity of a recoil or gas-operated reloading mechanism. Blish's design (then known as the Blish Lock) was based on the supposed adhesion of inclined metal surfaces under pressure. Thompson gained financial backing from the businessman Thomas F. Ryan and proceeded to found a company, which he named the Auto-Ordnance Company, in 1916, for the purpose of developing his new "auto rifle".

The Thompson was primarily developed in Cleveland, Ohio. Its principal designers were Theodore H. Eickhoff, Oscar V. Payne, and George E. Goll. By late 1917, the limits of the Blish Lock were discovered (which is essentially an extreme manifestation of static friction), and, rather than the firearm working as a locked breech, the weapon was instead designed to function as a friction-delayed blowback action. It was found that the only cartridge currently in service suitable for use with the new lock was the .45 ACP. General Thompson envisioned a "one-man, hand-held machine gun" chambered in .45 ACP to be used as a "trench broom" for the ongoing trench warfare of World War I. Oscar V. Payne designed the new firearm along with its stick and drum magazines. The project was titled "Annihilator I". Most of the design issues had been resolved by 1918; however, the war ended two days before prototypes could be shipped to Europe.

At an Auto-Ordnance board meeting in 1919, in order to discuss the marketing of the "Annihilator", with the war now over the weapon was officially renamed the "Thompson Submachine Gun". While other weapons had been developed shortly prior with similar objectives in mind, the Thompson was the first weapon to be labeled and marketed as a "submachine gun". Thompson intended for the weapon to provide a high volume of automatic, man-portable fire for use in trench warfare—a role for which the Browning Automatic Rifle (BAR) had been determined ill-suited. The concept had already been developed by German troops using their own Bergmann MP 18 (the world's first submachine gun) in concert with their Sturmtruppen tactics.

Early use
The first Thompson entered production as the M1921. It was available to civilians, but, because of the weapon's high price, initially saw poor sales. The Thompson (with one Type XX 20 round "stick" magazine) had been priced at $200 in 1921 (roughly ).

M1921 Thompsons were sold in small numbers to the United States Postal Inspection Service so they could protect the mail from a spate of robberies. It was also sold to the United States Marine Corps, who used their Thompsons in the Banana Wars. Thompsons had also been widely used throughout China, where several Chinese warlords and their military factions running various parts of the fragmented country made purchases of the weapon, and subsequently produced many local copies.

The Thompson saw popularity as a point-defense weapon for countering ambushes by Nicaraguan guerrillas (in the Banana Wars) and led to the creation of four-man fire teams which had as much firepower as a nine-man rifle squad. Federal sales were then followed by sales to police departments in the US, as well as to various international armies and constabulary forces; chiefly in Central and South America.

The Thompson was first used in combat in June 13 1921, when West Virginia state troopers fired on the mountainside near Lick Creek, where striking miners were firing at passing cars. By the time of the Battle of Blair Mountain, 37 had been acquired by the West Virginia state police and 56 were in the hands of coal companies and local law enforcement. The guns were also shipped to various hardware stores in the region.

Some of the first batches of Thompsons were bought (in America) by agents of the Irish Republic (notably the Irish politician Harry Boland). The first test of the Thompson in Ireland was performed by Irish Republican Army unit commander Tom Barry, of the West Cork Brigade, in the presence of IRA leader Michael Collins. They purchased a total of 653 units, though US customs authorities in New York seized 495 of the units in June 1921. The remainder found their way to the Irish Republican Army by way of Liverpool, England, and were used in the last month of the Irish War of Independence (1919–21). After a truce with the British in July 1921, the Irish Republican Army imported more units, which were used in the subsequent Irish Civil War (1922–23). The Thompson was not found to be very effective in Ireland; having only caused serious casualties in 32 percent of the action in which it was used.

During the failed 1924 coup Estonian communists used Thompsons in an attempt to storm the Tallin barracks; meanwhile the MP 18 was used by the defenders. this was possibly the first engagement were submachineguns were used on both sides.

The Thompson achieved early notoriety in the hands of Prohibition and Great Depression-era gangsters and the lawmen who pursued them. It was also depicted in Hollywood films during this era, most notably regarding the St Valentine's Day Massacre. The Thompson guns used in the massacre are still being held by the Berrien County Sheriff's Department. The Thompson has been referred to by one researcher as the "gun that made the twenties roar".

In 1926, the Cutts Compensator (a muzzle brake) was offered as an attachment option for the Thompson. Models with the compensator were cataloged as No. 21AC, at the original price of $200. The plain Thompson (without the attachment) was designated No. 21A at a reduced price of $175.

In 1928, Federal Laboratories took over distribution of the weapon from Thompson's Auto Ordnance Corporation. The new cost was listed as $225 per weapon, with $5 per 50-round drum and $3 per 20-round magazine.

Nationalist China acquired a substantial number of Thompson guns for use against Japanese land forces. They began producing copies of the Thompson in small quantities for use by their armies and militias. In the 1930s, Taiyuan Arsenal (a Chinese weapons manufacturer) produced copies of the Thompson for Yan Xishan, then warlord of Shanxi province.

The FBI had also acquired Thompsons in 1933 following the Kansas City Massacre.

A number of these guns were acquired by a construction company in Brazil, after construction of a federal road in Sergipe was disrupted by armed Cangaçeiros in December 1937. The bandits violently opposed any attempts to build roads near their territory.

World War II

In 1938, the Thompson submachine gun was adopted by the U.S. military and was used during World War II.

There were two military types of Thompson submachine gun:

 The M1928A1, which had provisions for both box and drum magazines, utilized the Cutts muzzle brake, had cooling fins on the barrel, and employed a delayed blowback action with the charging handle on the top of the receiver.
 The M1 and M1A1, which had provisions for box magazines only, did not have cooling fins on the barrel, had a simplified rear sight, and employed a straight blowback action with the charging handle on the side of the receiver.
Over 1.5 million military Thompson submachine guns were produced during World War II.

Magazine developments
Military users of the M1928A1 units had complaints of the "L" 50-round drum magazine. The British Army criticized "the [magazine's] excessive weight, [and] the rattling sound they made" and shipped thousands back to the U.S. in exchange for 20-round box magazines. The Thompson had to be cocked, bolt retracted, ready to fire, in order to attach the drum magazine. The drum magazine also attached and detached by sliding sideways, which made magazine changes slow and cumbersome. They also created difficulty when clearing a cartridge malfunction ("jam"). Reloading an empty drum with cartridges was a difficult and involved process in which the 50 rounds would be inserted and then the magazine wound up until a minimum of 9 to 11 loud "clicks" were heard before seating the magazine into the weapon.

In contrast, the "XX" twenty-round box magazine was light and compact. It tended not to rattle, and could be inserted with the bolt safely closed. The box magazine was quickly attached and detached, and was removed downward, making clearing jams easier. The box magazine tripped the bolt open lock when empty, facilitating magazine changes. An empty box was easy to reload with loose rounds. However, users complained that it was limited in capacity. In the field, some soldiers would tape two "XX" magazines together, in what would be known as "jungle style", to quicken magazine changes.

Two alternatives to the "L"  50-round drum and "XX" 20-round box magazines were tested December 6, 1941, at Fort Knox, Kentucky. An extended thirty-round box magazine and a forty-round magazine, which were made by welding two 20-round magazines face to face, jungle style, were tested. The testers considered both superior to either the "XX" box or "L" drum. The 30-round box was approved as the new standard in December 1941 to replace the "XX" and "L" magazines. (The concept of welding two box magazines face-to-face was also carried over to the M42 submachine gun.)

M1 development
The staff of Savage Arms looked for ways to simplify the M1928A1, and produced a prototype in February 1942, which was tested at Aberdeen Proving Ground in March 1942. Army Ordnance approved adoption (as the M1) in April 1942. M1s were made by Savage Arms and by Auto-Ordnance. M1s were issued with the 30-round box magazine and would accept the earlier 20-round box, but would not accept the drum magazine.

Combat use

The Thompson was used in World War II in the hands of Allied troops as a weapon for scouts, non-commissioned officers (corporal, sergeant, and higher), and patrol leaders, as well as commissioned officers, tank crewmen, and soldiers performing raids on German positions. In the European theater, the gun was widely utilized in British and Canadian commando units, as well as in the U.S. Army paratrooper and Ranger battalions, where it was issued more frequently than in line infantry units because of its high rate of fire and its stopping power, which made it very effective in the kinds of close combat these special operations troops were expected to undertake. Military Police were fond of it, as were paratroopers, who "borrowed" Thompsons from members of mortar squads for use on patrols behind enemy lines. The gun was prized by those lucky enough to get one and proved itself in the close street fighting that was encountered frequently during the invasion of France. A Swedish variant of the M1928A1, the Kulsprutepistol m/40 (submachine gun, model 40), served in the Swedish Army between 1940 and 1951. Through Lend-Lease, the Soviet Union also received the Thompson, but due to a shortage of appropriate ammunition, its use was not widespread.

In the Malayan Campaign, the Burma Campaign and the Pacific Theater, Lend-Lease-issue Thompsons were used by the British Army, Indian Army, Australian Army infantry and other Commonwealth forces. They used the Thompson extensively in jungle patrols and ambushes, where it was prized for its firepower, though it was criticized for its hefty weight and poor reliability. In New Guinea, the Thompson was the only submachine gun available to the Australian Army for most of the vital Kokoda Track campaign in 1942. It became so prized that soldiers routinely picked up Thompson guns dropped by killed or wounded comrades. However, the weight of the ammunition and difficulties in supply eventually led to its replacement in Australian Army units in 1943 by Australian-made submachine guns, the Owen and Austen. Thompsons were also given to the Royal Australian Air Force and Royal Australian Navy.

In Burma and India, British forces largely replaced the Thompson with the Sten gun. New Zealand commando forces in the South Pacific campaign initially used Thompsons but switched them for the more reliable, lighter, and more accurate Owen during the Solomon Islands and Guadalcanal campaigns. The U.S. Marines also used the Thompson as a limited-issue weapon, especially during their later island assaults. The Thompson was soon found to have limited effect in heavy jungle cover, where the low-velocity .45 bullet would not penetrate most small-diameter trees or protective armor vests. (In 1923, the Army had rejected the .45 Remington–Thompson, which had twice the energy of the .45 ACP). In the U.S. Army, many Pacific War jungle patrols were originally equipped with Thompsons in the early phases of the New Guinea and Guadalcanal campaigns, but soon began employing the Browning Automatic Rifle in its place as a point defense weapon.

The Army introduced the U.S. M3 and M3A1 submachine guns in 1943 with plans to produce the latter in numbers sufficient to cancel future orders for the Thompson, while gradually withdrawing it from the first-line service. However, due to unforeseen production delays and requests for modifications, the M3/M3A1 never replaced the Thompson, and purchases continued until February 1944. Though the M3 was considerably cheaper to produce, at the end of World War II, the Thompson, with a total wartime production of over 1.5 million, outnumbered the M3/M3A1 submachine guns in service by nearly three to one.

After World War II

Thompson submachine guns were used by both sides during the 1948 Arab-Israeli war. Following the war, Thompsons were issued to members of Israel's elite Unit 101, upon the formation of that unit in 1953.

During the Greek Civil War, the Thompson submachine gun was used by both sides. The Hellenic Armed Forces, gendarmerie and police units were equipped with Thompson submachine guns supplied by the British and later in the war by the United States. The opposing Communist fighters of the Democratic Army of Greece were also using Thompson submachine guns, either captured from government forces or inherited from ELAS. ELAS was the strongest of the resistance forces during the period of Greek Resistance against the Germans and Italians and were supplied with arms from both the British and the United States. After the demobilization of ELAS, an unspecified number of arms were not surrendered to the government but kept hidden, and were later used by the Democratic Army of Greece.

The Thompson also found service with the KNIL and the Netherlands Marine Corps during their attempt to retake their former colony of Indonesia. Later by Indonesian infiltrators during the 1965 Indonesia–Malaysia confrontation.

By the time of the Korean War in 1950, the Thompson had seen much use by the U.S. and South Korean military, even though the Thompson had been replaced as standard-issue by the M3/M3A1. With huge numbers of guns available in army ordnance arsenals, the Thompson remained classed as Limited Standard or Substitute Standard long after the standardization of the M3/M3A1. Many Thompsons were distributed to the US-backed Nationalist Chinese armed forces as military aid before the fall of Chiang Kai-shek's government to Mao Zedong's communist forces at the end of the Chinese Civil War in 1949 (Thompsons had already been widely used throughout China since the 1920s, at a time when several Chinese warlords and their military factions running various parts of the fragmented country made purchases of the weapon and then subsequently produced many local copies). During the Korean War, US troops were surprised to encounter communist Chinese troops armed with Thompsons (amongst other captured US-made Nationalist Chinese and American firearms), especially during unexpected night-time assaults which became a prominent Chinese combat tactic in the conflict. The gun's ability to deliver large quantities of short-range automatic assault fire proved very useful in both defense and assault during the early part of the war when it was constantly mobile and shifting back and forth. Many Chinese Thompsons were captured and placed into service with American soldiers and marines for the remaining period of the war.

The Yugoslav Army received 34,000 M1A1 Thompsons during the 1950s as part of a US Military Aid to Yugoslavia Agreement. These guns were used during the Yugoslav Wars in the 1990s.

During the Cuban Revolution, the Thompson submachine gun was used by both Batista's army and Fidel Castro's guerrillas. Both the latter and the Brigade 2506 also used some during the Bay of Pigs Invasion.

During the Vietnam War, some South Vietnamese army units and defense militia were armed with Thompson submachine guns, and a few of these weapons were used by reconnaissance units, advisors, and other American troops. It was partially replaced by the MAC-10, albeit during Vietnam, the fully automatic fire provided by the M16 made the Thompson less effective than it previously had been. Still, not only did some U.S. soldiers have use of them in Vietnam, they encountered them as well. The Viet Cong liked the weapon and used both captured models as well as manufacturing their own copies in small jungle workshops.

The Australian government destroyed most of their Thompson machine carbines in the 1960s. They shipped their remaining stocks to arm the forces of Lon Nol's Khmer Republic in 1975. They were then captured and used by the Khmer Rouge.

During the Troubles (1969–1998), the Thompson was again used by the Irish Republican paramilitaries. According to historian Peter Hart, "The Thompson remained a key part of both the Official IRA and Provisional IRA arsenals until well into the 1970s when it was superseded by the Armalite and the AK-47."

The Thompson was also used by U.S. and overseas law enforcement and police forces, most prominently by the FBI. The FBI used Thompsons until they were declared obsolete and ordered destroyed in the early 1970s.

Collector interest
Because of their quality and craftsmanship, as well as their gangster-era and WWII connections, Thompsons are sought as collector's items. There were fewer than 40 pre-production prototypes. The Colt Patent Fire Arms Manufacturing Company in Hartford, Connecticut was contracted by the Auto-Ordnance Corporation to manufacture the initial mass production of 15,000 Thompson Submachine Guns in 1920. An original Colt Model 1921 A or AC, Model 1927 A or AC, Model 1928 Navy A or AC, properly registered in working condition with original components can easily fetch from US$25,000 to $45,000+ depending on condition and accessories. For WWII, approximately 1,700,000 Thompson Submachine Guns were produced by Auto-Ordnance and Savage Arms, with 1,387,134 being the simplified World War II M1 and M1A1 variants (without the Blish lock and oiling system).

A Model 1921A believed to have been owned by Bonnie and Clyde, but without historical documentation to substantiate this provenance, sold at auction on January 21, 2012, in Kansas City for $130,000.

Features

Operating characteristics

Early versions of the Thompson, the Model 1919, had a fairly high cyclic rate of fire, as high as 1,200 rounds per minute (rpm), with most Model 1921s at 800 rpm.  This rate of fire, combined with a rather heavy trigger pull and a stock with an excessive drop, increases the tendency for the barrel to climb off target in automatic fire. In 1927, the U.S. Navy ordered 500 Thompsons but requested a lower rate of fire. Thompson requested Payne to develop a method of reducing the cyclic rate of fire. Payne then replaced the actuator with one that was heavier, and replaced the recoil spring with one that was stiffer; the changes reduced the rate of fire from 800 to the 600 rpm of the U.S. Navy Model 1928. Later M1 and M1A1 Thompsons averaged also 600 rpm. Compared to more modern submachine guns, the Thompson is quite heavy, weighing roughly the same as the contemporary M1 Garand semi-automatic rifle, and requires a lot of cleaning. This was one of the major complaints about the weapon by U.S. Army personnel to whom it was issued.

Although the drum magazine provided significant firepower, in military service it was found to be overly heavy and bulky, especially when slung on the shoulder while marching. The M1928A1 Thompson drum magazine was rather fragile, and cartridges tended to rattle inside it, producing unwanted noise. For these reasons, the 20-round and later 30-round box magazines soon proved most popular with military users of the M1928A1, and drum compatibility was not included in the design of the wartime M1 and M1A1 models. The Thompson was one of the earliest submachine guns to incorporate a double-column, staggered-feed box magazine design, which undoubtedly contributed to the gun's reputation for reliability. In addition, the gun performed better than most after exposure to rain, dirt, and mud.

The selective-fire (semi or fully automatic) Thompson fires from the "open bolt" position, in which the bolt is held fully to rearward by the sear when cocked. When the trigger is depressed, the bolt is released, traveling forward to chamber and simultaneously fire the first and subsequent rounds until either the trigger is released or the ammunition is exhausted. This eliminates the risk of "cook-off", which can sometimes occur in closed-bolt automatic weapons.

Disassembly
The 1928 variant can be disassembled easily by first detaching the stock, then sliding off the lower receiver and then simply removing the internal parts, cleaning them, and then putting it back together. When opened up, the Thompson features a small number of parts that need to be removed including the spring, bolt, Blish Lock, and actuator bolt.

Variants

Prototypes

Persuader and Annihilator
There were two main experimental models of the Thompson. The Persuader was a belt-fed version developed in 1917/18. It was partially built, but never completely finished. The Annihilator, serial no. Ver 10 prototypes were similar in appearance to the later models, but without the rear sight and butt stock mounts. The Annihilator prototypes first were fed from a 20-round box magazine, but later, the 50- and 100-round drum magazine models were developed.

Model 1919
Starting with the Serial no. 11, the Model 1919 takes the final appearance of the later Thompsons with the rear sights and butt stock. The Model 1919 was limited to about 40 units; the first built did not use the drums, as it was too difficult to fire. Many variations have been noted within this model. The weapons had very high cyclic rates up to 1,500 rpm. This was the weapon Brigadier General Thompson demonstrated at Camp Perry in 1920. A number of Model 1919s were made without butt stocks, rear and front sights, but the final version closely resembled the later Model 1921.  This model was designed to "sweep" trenches with bullets. The New York City Police Department was the largest purchaser of the M1919. Some experimental calibers aside from the standard .45 ACP (11.4x23mm) were the .22LR, .32 ACP, .38 ACP, and 9mm.

.351 WSL variant
Only one prototype was made in .351 WSL using a standard 20" barrel which had a ROF of 1000rpm.

Thompson .30 Carbine
The layout and ergonomics of the Thompson submachine gun were also considered for the role of a Light Rifle before the adoption of the M1 Carbine. An example known as the "Calibre .30 Short Rifle" was based on the M1921/27 variants. However, it was turned down without testing due to logistical problems.

.30-06 variant
A .30–06 variant was intended as a rival to the M1918 BAR. It had an extended receiver with a recoil buffer and was fed from 20-round magazines.

Production

Model 1921

The Model 1921 (M1921) was the first major production model. Fifteen thousand were produced by Colt for Auto-Ordnance. In its original design, it was finished more like a sporting weapon, with an adjustable rear sight, a blued, finned barrel and vertical foregrip (or pistol grip) and the Blish lock. The M1921 was quite expensive to manufacture, with the original retail price around $200, because of its high-quality wood furniture and finely machined parts. The M1921 was famous throughout its career with police and criminals and in motion pictures. This model gained fame from its use by criminals during Prohibition, and was nicknamed "tommy gun" by the media.

Model 1923
The Model 1923 was a heavy submachine gun introduced to potentially expand the Auto-Ordnance product line and was demonstrated for the U.S. Army. It introduced a horizontal forearm, improved inline stock for accuracy,  barrel, bipod, and bayonet lug. The M1923 was intended to rival the M1918 Browning Automatic Rifle (BAR), with which the Army was already satisfied. The Army did not give the Model 1923 much consideration, so it was not adopted. In addition to the .45 Remington–Thompson, the M1923 Thompsons were to be made available to prospective buyers in several calibers, including .45 ACP, 9mm Parabellum, 9mm Mauser, and .351 Winchester Self-loading.

Model 1921AC (1926)
While not a new model in the usual sense of incorporating major changes, in 1926 the Cutts Compensator (a muzzle brake) was offered as an option for the M1921; Thompsons with the compensator were cataloged as No. 21AC at the original price of $200.00, with the plain M1921 designated No. 21A at a reduced price of $175.00. The Model 1921 was thereafter referred to as Model 1921A or Model 1921AC, though some collectors still refer to it as the Model 1921.

Model 1928
The Model 1928 was the first type widely used by military forces, with the U.S. Navy and U.S. Marine Corps as major buyers through the 1930s. The original Model 1928s were Model 1921s with weight added to the actuator, which slowed down the cyclic rate of fire, a United States Navy requirement. On these guns, the model number "1921" on the receiver was updated by stamping an "8" over the last "1". The Navy Model 1928 has several names among collectors: the "Colt Overstamp", "1921 Overstamp", "28 Navy", or just "28N".

The 1928 Thompson would be the last small arm adopted by the U.S. Army that used a year designation in the official nomenclature. With the start of World War II, major contracts from several countries saved the manufacturer from bankruptcy. A notable variant of the Model 1928 with an aluminum receiver and tenite grip, buttstock, and forend, was made by Savage.

M1928A1

The M1928A1 variant entered mass production before the attack on Pearl Harbor, as on-hand stocks ran out. Changes included a horizontal forend, in place of the distinctive vertical foregrip ("pistol grip"), and a provision for a military sling. Despite new U.S. contracts for Lend-Lease shipments abroad to China, France, and the United Kingdom, as well as the needs of American armed forces, only two factories supplied M1928A1 Thompsons during the early years of World War II. Though it could use both the 50-round drum and the 20- or 30-round box magazines, active service favored the box magazines as the drums were more prone to jamming, rattled when moving, and were too heavy and bulky on long patrols. 562,511 were made. Wartime production variants had a fixed rear sight without the triangular sight guard wings and a non-ribbed barrel, both like those found on the M1/M1A1.

In addition, the Soviet Union received M1928A1s, included as standard equipment with the M3 light tanks obtained through Lend-Lease. These submachine guns were used to a limited extent by the Red Army.

Some M1928A1 Thompsons were used by the French before and during the Battle of France (1940) under the designation "Pistolet-mitrailleur 11 mm 43 (C.45) M. 28 A1."

An M1928A1 with an unusual inline stock, modified with elevated sights to increase accuracy, also was produced. Some Thompsons were built with a folding stock, similar to M1A1 Carbines used by Allied tank crews, drivers and paratroopers and submarine raiders.

Service variants

Thompson Machine Carbine (TMC)
In 1940, Commonwealth troops in Egypt and North Africa were issued commercial model Lend-Lease Colt- and Savage-manufactured M1928s. Section leaders carried them instead of pistols or rifles. Many of the Colt models had French-language manuals packed with them as they had been abruptly diverted to England after the fall of France. They soon discovered that the weapon was prone to jamming due to sand. To fix this, the armorers removed the Blish Lock and replaced it with a hex bolt to keep the cocking handle and bolt together. The 20-round Type XX magazines had their peep-holes welded shut to keep sand out and the 50-round Type L drums were discontinued. Ammunition was scarce as it was either in small lots of Lend-Lease commercial ammo or obtained from adjacent American troops. It was later replaced by the 9mm Sten gun and Lanchester SMG.

Models used in the Pacific by Australian troops had their sling swivels remounted on the left side to allow it to be fired more easily while prone. A metal sling mount was fitted to the left side of the wooden buttstock. Ammunition was manufactured in Australia or obtained from adjacent American troops. It was later replaced by the Owen Machine Carbine.

M1

Responding to a request for further simplification, the M1 was standardized in April 1942 as the United States Submachine Gun, Cal. .45, M1. Rate of fire was reduced to approximately 600–700 rpm.

First issued in 1943, the M1 uses a simple blowback operation, with the charging handle moved to the side. The flip-up adjustable Lyman rear sight was replaced with a fixed L sight. Late M1s had triangular guard wings added to the rear L sight, which were standardized on the M1A1. The slots adjoining the magazine well allowing the use of a drum magazine were removed. A new magazine catch with the provision for retaining drum magazines removed, was produced, but most M1s and later M1A1s retained the original. The less expensive and more-easily manufactured "stick" magazines were used exclusively in the M1, with a new 30-round version joining the familiar 20-round type. The Cutts compensator, barrel cooling fins, and Blish lock were omitted while the buttstock was permanently affixed. Late production M1 stocks were fitted with reinforcing bolts and washers to prevent splitting of the stock where it attached to the receiver. The British had used improvised bolts or wood screws to reinforce M1928 stocks. The M1 reinforcing bolt and washer were carried over to the M1A1 and retrofitted to many of the M1928A1s in U.S. and British service. Late M1s also had simplified fire control switches, also carried over to the M1A1. Certain M1s had issues with high rate of fire climbing up to ~800 RPM. The exact cause remains unknown, but was resolved with the transition to the M1A1.

M1A1 

The M1A1, standardized in October 1942 as the United States Submachine Gun, Cal. .45, M1A1, could be produced in half the time of the M1928A1, and at a much lower cost. The main difference between the M1 and M1A1 was the bolt. The M1 bolt had a floating firing pin and hammer, the bolt of the M1A1 had the firing pin machined to the face of the bolt, eliminating unnecessary parts. The reinforced stock and protective sight wings were standard. The 30-round magazine became more common. In 1939, Thompsons cost the government $209 apiece. By the spring of 1942, cost-reduction design changes had brought this down to $70. In February 1944, the M1A1 reached a low price of $45 each, including accessories and spare parts, although the difference in price between the M1 and M1A1 was only $0.06. By the end of the war, the M1A1 was replaced with the even lower-cost M3 (commonly called the "Grease Gun").

Semi-automatic

Model 1927
The Model 1927 was the open bolt semi-automatic version of the M1921. It was made by modifying an existing Model 1921, including replacing certain parts. The "Thompson Submachine Gun" inscription was machined over to replace it with "Thompson Semi-Automatic Carbine", and the "Model 1921" inscription was also machined over to replace it with "Model 1927." Although the Model 1927 was semi-automatic only, it was easily converted to fully automatic by installing a full-auto Model 1921 fire control group (internal parts). Most Model 1927s owned by police have been converted back to full-auto. The original Model 1927 is classified as a machine gun under the National Firearms Act of 1934 (a) by being "readily convertible" by swapping parts and (b) by a 1982 BATF ruling making all open bolt semi-automatic firearms manufactured after the date of this ruling classified as machine guns.

Model 1927A1
The Model 1927A1 is a semi-automatic replica version of the Thompson, originally produced by Auto-Ordnance of West Hurley, New York for the civilian collector's market from 1974 to 1999. It has been produced since 1999 by Kahr Arms of Worcester, Massachusetts. It is officially known as the "Thompson Semi-Automatic Carbine, Model of 1927A1." Under federal regulations, these changes make the Model 1927A1 legally a rifle and remove it from the federal registry requirements of the National Firearms Act. These modern versions should not be confused with the original semi-automatic M1927, which was a slightly modified M1921 produced by Colt for Auto-Ordnance.

The Model 1927A1 is the semi-automatic replica of the Thompson Models of 1921 and 1927. The "Thompson Commando" is a semi-automatic replica of the M1928A1. The Auto-Ordnance replica of the Thompson M1 and M1A1 is known as the TM1, and may be found marked "Thompson Semi-Automatic Carbine, Caliber .45M1".

Model 1927A3
The Model 1927A3 is a semi-automatic, .22 caliber version of the Thompson produced by Auto-Ordnance in West Hurley.

Model 1927A5
The Model 1927A5 is a semi-automatic, .45 ACP pistol version of the Thompson originally produced by Auto-Ordnance in West Hurley from the 1970s until the early 1990s or late 1980s. It featured an aluminum receiver to reduce weight. It has since been replaced with the Kahr Arms TA5 Pistol, which features a 10.5" barrel and steel receiver, unlike the 1927A5's 13" barrel and aluminum receiver.

As per the NFA (National Firearms Act of 1934), the "1927A5 .45 ACP Pistol" is simply classified as a "Firearm" (Any type of firearm with an overall length of 26" or greater, that does not have a buttstock) as it neither fits the definition of a Pistol or Rifle under federal law. This categorization also legally allows it to have 1921 or 1928 style foregrip equipped, unlike other "pistol style" Thompson variants, without an AOW (Any Other Weapon) Tax Stamp.

1928A1 LTD
The 1928A1 LTD is a civilian semi-automatic conversion by Luxembourg Defense Technology (LuxDefTec) in Luxembourg. They are made from original 1928A1 guns of various appearance (with or without Cutt's compensator, ribbed or smooth barrels, adjustable or fixed sights), that were imported Lend-Lease guns from Russia.

Export variants

BSA Thompsons
In an attempt to expand interest and sales overseas, Auto-Ordnance entered into a partnership with and licensed the Birmingham Small Arms Company Limited (BSA) in England to produce a European model. These were produced in small quantities and have a different appearance than the classic style. The BSA 1926 was manufactured in 9mmP and 7.63mm Mauser and were tested by various governments, including France, in the mid-1920s. It was never adopted by any military force, and only a small number were produced.

RPB Thompsons

Special purpose variant
A special purpose machine pistol variant of the Thompson is manufactured by RPB Industries of Atlanta.

Suppressed variant
A version with a threaded barrel for suppressors, side folding stock, and modified sights.

Civilian ownership

Canada
All variants and modified versions of Thompson submachine guns (even semiautomatic-only versions) are prohibited by name in Canada, as part of Prohibited Weapons Order No. 13 in 1995. Consequently, they cannot be legally imported or owned except under very limited circumstances. For example, to own one the person must be "grandfathered" and have owned one before the bill was passed against it. The submachine gun is not grandfathered like in the U.S., only the owner. The submachine gun can only be sold to other grandfathered individuals; this keeps prices extremely low as the number of permitted licensed individuals is very small and dwindling with time. Eventually, all prohibited guns will be out of circulation.

United States

The perceived popularity of submachine guns such as the Thompson with violent gangsters in the 1920s and 1930s was one of the main reasons given for passage of the National Firearms Act by the United States Congress in 1934. One of its provisions was that owners of fully automatic firearms were required to register them with the predecessor agency of the modern Bureau of Alcohol, Tobacco, Firearms and Explosives (ATF). The law also placed restrictions on the possession, transfer, and transport of the weapons.

There are several U.S. made automatic and semi-automatic variants, copies, or replicas. The semi-automatic versions are less regulated by federal law.

United Kingdom
The possession of any fully automatic firearm is prohibited in the UK by the Firearms Act 1968; prohibited firearms can be possessed on a section 5 certificate, but these are not issued for sporting purposes. A fully automatic firearm that has been converted to semi-automatic fire, such as the Model 1927, is prohibited by the Firearms Act 1988, as is any centre-fire purpose-made semi-automatic weapon, such as the Model 1927A1. It is now effectively impossible for a firearm of this type to be legally possessed by a member of the general public, except in certified deactivated condition or where specifically manufactured as a semi-automatic in caliber .22LR.

Germany
The gun, in a government approved semiautomatic conversion or clone, can legally be owned by hunters and sport shooters. With a design date prior to 1942 it is not considered a "weapon of war." Only the fully automatic version is a prohibited weapon. As a long gun, it can be bought by hunters (even if it cannot be used to actually hunt for legal reasons). There are disciplines in government approved sport shooting rulebooks that allow this type to be used, therefore the gun can be bought by sport shooters, too.

Users

 : M1928 and M1 Thompson
: Used by the Belgian Army and Gendarmerie post-WW2, and it remained in service with the Gendarmerie until 1971.
M1921 used during the Chaco War.M1A1 used by police
:Adopted by the Pernambuco military police and used against messianic cultists during the 1938 Pau de Colher massacre. The M1 was Used by the Brazilian forces from WWII until the mid-1980s.
 British India: Widely used by the Indian Army in the Malayan Campaign, in the European theatre and Burma Campaigns

: Unlicensed copies

: Simplified copies of the Thompson were manufactured under license after WW2, with barrels and magazines imported from the United States. Those copies used 20 round stick magazines and lacked a flash hider.
:M1928A1 and M1 issued to Ethiopian forces during the Korean War
: The M1928A1 was used as the Pistolet-mitrailleur 11 mm 43 (C.45) M. 28 A1. The M1A1 was also used.
:US supplied Thompsons were used by the Bundeswehr before the adoption of the G3
: Used by Greek armed forces, resistance fighters, Gendarmerie and police units during World War II and immediately postwar period.
 : M1A1 used Policía Nacional Civil up to 2014

: Iraqi insurgents
: Used by the Imperial Iranian Guard Units, first saw action during the Iran crisis of 1946.

:
: Captured examples pressed into use by the Italian Army prior to September 8, 1943. Also supplied to partisans and to the Italian Co-belligerent Army. After the war, it was mostly issued to Italian Air Force troopers and the Carabinieri.
: Were used in some quantities by the Japanese Maritime Self-Defense Force

: Limited received by U.S government and used during the First Indochina War and Vietnam War.
: M1A1 in service 1952–1967, replaced by Uzi.
: M1928
 
: In early World War II, at least 3,680 Thompsons acquired through Lend-Lease
: M1928, M1928A1M1 and M1A1
: The Nicaraguan National Guard received M1928A1s and some were captured by Sandino's rebels.
: Chinese-made Thompsons used by the Korean People's Army in the Korean War.
: Unlicensed copies. Used by Viet Minh in the First Indochina War.
: M1928A1 Formerly used by the Panamanian National Guard, and used by Dignity Battalion militia of the defunct Panama Defense Forces. 
: Used by the Polish Armed Forces in the West during WWII and by resistance fighters during the Warsaw Uprising (from supply drops)
: Small number bought for police use, designated m/1928
 

:In 1924 a large number of M1921s was purchased through Mexico and issued to NKVD and border guards. 137,729 were received through Lend-Lease in WW2
: In January 25, 1940, The Royal Swedish Army ordered 500 M1928 Submachine Guns from AB UNO Lindholm & Co. Each gun was supplied with four 20 round box magazines and one 50 round drum magazine. According to Major Carl-Olof Bjorsell the Swedish Thompson’s were sold to Israel during 1950s.
: Received US surplus guns after WW2
As of 2011 between 10.000 to 20.000 guns were stored in Ministry of Defense warehouse. </ref>
. First issued to the GHQ Liaison Unit ('Phantom') in February 1940, in advance of main War Office contracts. Used by the homeguard
: Employed by the United States Marine Corps and by the United States Army 1938, including paratroops in World War II.
  Used by Viet Cong during Vietnam War.

Non-state groups
The Provisional IRA and Official IRA used the 1921 variant, mainly during the early 1960s to 1970s.
The Angry Brigade
 Azerbaijan People's Government
 Afghan Mujahideen
 Brigade 2506
 Front de Libération de la Côte des Somalis
  The Thompson was supllied to Malayan Communist Party insurgents during WW2, and used during the Malayan Emergency
 The Communist Party of Estonia received four Thompsons from the Soviet Union before the failed 1924 coup
The Turkish Resistance Organization manufactured its own copies with parts supplied by Turkey

See also
List of U.S. Army weapons by supply catalog designation SNL A-32

References

Bibliography

Albert, David and Sig, Mike. (2005). Thompson Manuals, Catalogs, and Other Paper Items. Self Published.
Bannan, James F. and Hill, Tracie L. (1989). Notes On Auto-Ordnance. South West Publishing Co.

Burrough, Bryan. (2004). Public Enemies: America's Greatest Crime Wave and the Birth of the FBI. The Penguin Press.
Cox, Roger A. (1982). The Thompson Submachine Gun. Law Enforcement Ordnance Company.

Ellis, Chris. (1998). The Thompson Submachine Gun. Military Book Club.

Herigstad, Gordon. (1996). Colt Thompson Serial Numbers. Self-published.
Hill, Tracie L. (1996). Thompson: The American Legend. Collector Grade Publications.
Hill, Tracie L. (2009). The Ultimate Thompson Book. Collector Grade Publications.
Hogg, Ian V. and Weeks, John. (1989). Military Small Arms of the 20th Century. DBI Books Inc.
Huon, Jean. (1995). Les pistolets-mitrailleurs Thompson. Barnett Editions, also Editions Crepin-LeBlond.

Iannamico, Frank. (2003). "The Colt Thompson Submachine Gun". The Shotgun News Treasury Issue Volume 4. Primedia Publishing
Iannamico, Frank. (2004). American Thunder II: The Military Thompson Submachine Gun. Moose Lake Publishing.
Iannamico, Frank. (2004). United States Submachine Guns. Moose Lake Publishing.
Johnson, Melvin M. and Haven, Charles J. (1941). Automatic Arms. William Morrow and Co.
Linton, Peter. The Machinist's Guide to the Thompson Submachine Gun (2012) Gun Show Books Publishing 
 
Moremon, John (2022). "The Tommy Gun in Jungle Warfare: The Use and Usefulness of the Thompson Submachine Gun for Australian Soldiers on the Kokoda Trail, New Guinea, 1942," Vulcan: The Journal of the History of Military Technology, 9(1), 84-117. doi: https://doi.org/10.1163/22134603-09010005
Nelson, Thomas B. (1963). The World's Submachine Guns, Volume I. International Small Arms Publishers.

 Olive, Ronaldo. (1996). Guia Internacional de Submetralhadoras. Editora Magnum Ltda.

Sharpe, Philip B. "The Thompson Sub-Machine Gun (in Police Science)" Journal of Criminal Law and Criminology (1931–1951), Vol. 23, No. 6. (Mar. – Apr., 1933), pp. 1098–1114.
Smith, Charles H. A brief story of Auto-Ordnance Company.

"Sturmgewehr!" by R. Blake Stevens Collector Grade Publications (2004). Thompsons(!) in Weimar Germany ISBN 0889353565, 9780889353565
Weeks, John. (1980). World War II Small Arms. Galahad Books.
Wilson, R.K. (1943). Textbook of Automatic Pistols. Small Arms Technical Publishing Company.

External links

Auto Ordnance
The Official Thompson Collectors Association Page

.45 ACP submachine guns
American inventions
Weapons and ammunition introduced in 1921
Police weapons
Savage Arms
Submachine guns of the United States
United States Army equipment
United States Marine Corps equipment
Weapons of the Philippine Army
World War II firearms of the United States
World War II infantry weapons of Australia
World War II infantry weapons of China
World War II infantry weapons of France
World War II infantry weapons of Greece
World War II infantry weapons of the United Kingdom
World War II military equipment of the Netherlands
World War II infantry weapons of the Soviet Union
World War II military equipment of Yugoslavia
World War II submachine guns